The Royal New Zealand Air Force Ensign is the official flag which is used to represent the Royal New Zealand Air Force. The ensign has a field of air force blue with the Union Jack in the canton and the Royal New Zealand Air Force's roundel in the middle of the fly. It is based on the British Royal Air Force Ensign with the letters "NZ" superimposed in white over the red central disc of the roundel.

References

External links
New Zealand History - Royal New Zealand Air Force Ensign

Royal New Zealand Air Force
Flags of New Zealand
Air Force ensigns
Flags with crosses
Light blue ensigns